Openfield is a British grain marketing and arable inputs co-operative based in Lincolnshire. It is one of Britain's largest agricultural companies and Britain's only national co-operative in its field, with a turnover of almost £700m. It markets grain for farmers and grain stores. In other countries, mainly Canada, this type of company is known as a wheat pool. The head office is based on the former RAF North Witham and prominent customers include some of the largest and well known British food and drink brands in the UK.

Openfield is a member of the Fertiliser Industry Assurance Scheme, and work with the fertiliser supplier GrowHow UK. It is also a member of the Agricultural Industries Confederation.

History
It was formed in November 2008 from the merger of Centaur Grain (of Andover) and Grainfarmers (of Micheldever, Winchester). It is now the largest UK farmer owned grain marketing co-operative and one of the largest companies in Lincolnshire, by turnover. The Colsterworth site opened in 1980.

Centaur Grain
Viking Cereals joined Centaur in 2002. Centaur had been formed in 2001 when Group Cereal Services (GCS) of South East England joined Lingrain of the East of England. It was based at Goodworth Clatford in north Hampshire.

Grainfarmers
This began as the Southern Counties Agricultural Trading Society in 1907. It was renamed as Grainfarmers Group Ltd in 2003. It had offices in Aberdeen, Walton (near Wetherby), Bressingham, Compton Abdale, Cannington and Micheldever. It marketed over 20% of the UK's grain and represented over 5000 farmers.

External links
 Openfield
 "Anticipated merger between Grainfarmers Group and Centaur Grain Group" (Office of Fair Trading, 2008)
 

British companies established in 2008
Companies based in Lincolnshire
South Kesteven District
Co-operatives in the United Kingdom
Agricultural marketing cooperatives
Agricultural supply cooperatives
Grain companies
Agriculture companies established in 2008
2008 establishments in England